Nikolai Aleksandrovich Vovk (born 8 January 1997) is a Russian football player.

Club career
He made his debut in the Russian Football National League for FC Shinnik Yaroslavl on 22 March 2015 in a game against FC Luch-Energiya Vladivostok.

References

External links
 Profile by Russian Football National League
 

1997 births
Footballers from Yaroslavl
Living people
Russian footballers
Association football midfielders
FC Shinnik Yaroslavl players
FC Znamya Truda Orekhovo-Zuyevo players
FC Torpedo Vladimir players